Semioptila lydia is a moth in the Himantopteridae family. It was described by Gustav Weymer in 1908. It is found in Angola.

References

Endemic fauna of Angola
Moths described in 1908
Himantopteridae